The 1984–85 All-Ireland Senior Club Football Championship was the 15th staging of the All-Ireland Senior Club Football Championship since its establishment by the Gaelic Athletic Association in 1970-71.

Nemo Rangers were the defending champions, however, they failed to qualify after being beaten by Carbery in the 1984 Cork County Championship.

On 24 March 1985, Castleisland Desmonds won the championship following a 2–02 to 0–07 defeat of St. Vincent's in the All-Ireland final at Seán Treacy Park. It remains their only championship title.

Results

Munster Senior Club Football Championship

First round

Semi-finals

Final

All-Ireland Senior Club Football Championship

Quarter-final

Semi-finals

Final

References

1984 in Gaelic football
1985 in Gaelic football